HMS Trenchant (P331) was a British T class submarine of the Second World War built at Chatham Dockyard.

On completion she was given over to the crew of HMS Thrasher whose submarine was due for a refit.

Service
Trenchant under her captain Commander Arthur Hezlet, DSO, DSC acted in the Far East mostly off South East Asia against Japanese shipping sinking a range of vessels both transports and warships, using her torpedoes, gun and also by ramming.  She often operated in company with her sister, HMS Terrapin.

On 23 September 1944 she sank the German submarine U-859 in the Straits of Malacca, by torpedoes. 11 of the crew were taken aboard as prisoners of war.

On 27 October 1944, "Chariots" carried into action by Trenchant sank a Japanese Army cargo ship, the Sumatra Maru in Phuket harbour, Siam.

Her most significant action during the war was on 8 June 1945, when she sank the Japanese cruiser Ashigara at a range of 4,000 yards with five out of eight torpedoes fired. The action in the Bangka Straits earned her commander a second DSO and the US Legion of Merit, and the ship the battle honour "Malaya 1944-45". The Ashigara had been carrying some 1,600 Japanese Army troops and materiel.

References

 British submarines of World War II
 British submarines of World War II
 Uboat.net

External links
 http://www.royalnavy.mod.uk/server/show/nav.2558 

 

British T-class submarines of the Royal Navy
Ships built in Chatham
1943 ships
World War II submarines of the United Kingdom
Cold War submarines of the United Kingdom